Telos marks the third full-length album from Forevermore. Solid State Records released the project on July 22, 2014. Forevermore worked with Jordan Furr on the production of this album.

Reception

Specifying in a three star review by HM Magazine, Nate Lake regards, "Telos is mixed very well, providing a crisp sound that stands out in a scene of generic metalcore acts." Matt Conner, indicating in a three star review from CCM Magazine, recognizing, "Forevermore, Solid State’s newest signing, is going for 'interesting and enjoyable' on their new album, Telos." Signaling in a four star review from Jesus Freak Hideout, Michael Weaver responds, "Forevermore have a lot to offer metal fans in Telos. It's certainly not the greatest metal album I've heard and it's not even the greatest debut I've heard, but it is a really, really solid release... Forevermore have some stout competition by releasing their album the same day as metalcore stalwarts War of Ages' stellar release, Supreme Chaos, but Telos can definitely compete." Brody B., writes in a four star review from Indie Vision Music, replying, "Forevermore have crafted an enjoyable and incredibly solid debut record filled with tracks that show immense potential." Awarding the album seven and a half stars for Jesus Wired, Topher P. writes, "For the most part the flow is a good thing; however there are times when the continuity grows tiresome, and everything seems to be a little monotonous."

Track listing

Charts

References

2014 albums
Forevermore (band) albums
Solid State Records albums